Lipniki  (German Lindenau) is a village in the administrative district of Gmina Kamiennik, within Nysa County, Opole Voivodeship, in south-western Poland.

The village has a population of 650.

References

Villages in Nysa County